Go Team may refer to:

Teams
 Go team, a unit of the USA's National Transportation Safety Board that investigates transport accidents
 1958 LSU Tigers football team Go(ld) Team

Music
 The Go! Team, an English band
 The Go Team, a 1980s band from Olympia, Washington

See also 
 Team Go
 "Go Team Go", an episode of the Disney Channel series Kim Possible